Sredorek is a historical and geographical region in northeastern Republic of Macedonia. It includes settlements in the Pčinja river valley, parts of the mountainous regions of Kozjak (Kozjačija), German and Rujen, which are today located within the Municipality of Staro Nagoričane. The region is predominantly inhabited by ethnic Macedonians and ethnic Serbs (see Serbs in the Republic of Macedonia), adherents of Eastern Orthodoxy. In the Middle Ages, the region was part of the župe (counties) of Žegligovo and Preševo.

Notable monuments in the region include the Church of St. George,

Geography
The region includes settlements in the Pčinja river valley, parts of the mountainous regions of Kozjak (Kozjačija), German, Rujen, which are today located within the Municipality of Staro Nagoričane; roughly from Pčinja and the lower course of the Kriva Reka. The region borders Serbia to the north, and the historical and geographical regions of Slavište and Stracin.

Settlements
 
Staro Nagoričane, Kozjak region
Ruǵince, Pčinja valley
Dejlovce, German region
Vračevce, Kozjak region
Malotino, Rujen region
Stepance, Kozjak and German region
Strezovce, Pčinja valley
Strnovac, Rujen region
Cvilance, Pčinja valley
Čelopek, Pčinja valley
Ramno, Kozjak and German region
Puzajka, Rujen region
Pelince, Pčinja valley
Osiče, German region
Orah, Pčinja valley
Oblavce, Pčinja valley
Nikuljane, mountainous region
Mlado Nagoričane, Pčinja valley
Makreš, Pčinja valley
Miglence, Rujen region
Kokino, Kozjak region
Koince, Pčinja valley
Karlovce, Kozjak region
Kanarevo, Pčinja valley
Željuvino, German region
Žegljane, Kozjak region
Dragomance, Pčinja valley
Dobrača, Pčinja valley
Vragoturce, Kozjak region
Vojnik, Pčinja valley
Bukovljane, Kozjak region
Breško, German region
Bajlovce, German region
Arbanaško, Kozjak and German region
Aljince, German region
Algunja, mountainous

History
In 1354, when Dejan had finished building the Arhiljevica Church of the Holy Mother of God, his endowment, he asked that some of the villages under his administration be granted to the church (as metochion). According to Stefan Dušan's charter to Arhiljevica dated 10 August 1354, sevastokrator Dejan, whom he called his brother ("брат царства ми севастократор Дејан"), possessed a large province east of Skopska Crna Gora. It included the old župe (counties) of Žegligovo and Preševo (modern Kumanovo region with Sredorek, Kozjačija and the larger part of Pčinja). Among the granted villages, still existing today in Sredorek, were: Ruǵince, Dejlovce and Vračevce.

Serbian geographer and sociologist Jovan Cvijić travelled and studied the lands, and included the region of Sredorek (chapter "Средорек, Страцин и Славиште"). Jovan Hadži-Vasiljević also travelled and studied the lands.

References

Bibliography

Geography of North Macedonia
Staro Nagoričane Municipality